Ceylonosticta rupasinghe (Rupasinghe's shadowdamsel) is a species of damselfly in the family Platystictidae. It is endemic to Sri Lanka, which was found recently from Samanala Nature Reserve, Ratnapura.

Etymology
The species name rupasinghe was named as an honor for Professor Mahinda S. Rupasinghe, who is a geologist, and former vice-chancellor of Sabaragamuwa University of Sri Lanka.

See also
 List of odonates of Sri Lanka

References

Damselflies of Sri Lanka
Insects described in 2016